The 1988 Eisenhower Trophy took place 15 to 18 September at the Ullna Golf Club near Stockholm, Sweden. It was the 16th World Amateur Team Championship for the Eisenhower Trophy. The tournament was a 72-hole stroke play team event with 39 four-man teams. The best three scores for each round counted towards the team total.

The combined team of Great Britain and Ireland won the Eisenhower Trophy for the third time, finishing five strokes ahead of the silver medalists, United States. Australia took the bronze medal, a further eight strokes behind with Sweden finishing fourth. Peter McEvoy, representing Great Britain and Ireland, had the lowest individual score, 4-under-par 284, six strokes better than Australian David Ecob.

Teams
39 four-man teams contested the event.

Scores

Source:

Individual leaders
There was no official recognition for the lowest individual scores.

Source:

References

External links
Record Book on International Golf Federation website (part) 

Eisenhower Trophy
Golf tournaments in Sweden
Eisenhower Trophy
Eisenhower Trophy
Eisenhower Trophy